The Flanagan Brothers were an Irish American band formed in the 1920s which consisted of brothers Michael, Joseph, and Louis Flanagan. Their choice of instruments and related skill gave them a unique sound, which led them to become one of the leading attractions in New York City's Irish dancehalls during the 1920s and 1930s. Subsequently, their phonograph records extended their popularity and fame to Ireland proper and into the homes of Irish emigrants throughout the world. They became a household name among Irish entertainers and were on par with the other great music ambassadors of the time, Michael Coleman and John McCormack.

Early history

The Flanagan brothers—Joe, Louis, and Mike—were born at the end of the nineteenth century and raised in the city of Waterford, on the south coast of Ireland. Their father, Arthur Flanagan, was a coachman and quay laborer in Waterford, where he met and, in 1890, married Ellen Keane. Working on the quays, Arthur was familiar with the ships that plied the trade to the United States, and as a young man he had made several working trips there. Ellen and Arthur began their married life in Philadelphia, Pennsylvania where their eldest daughter was born, followed by a son in 1894, Arthur Joseph, "Joe." The family subsequently returned to Waterford and settled in a three-room house on Summerhill Terrace where five more children were born - two girls and three boys. Louis, named after his maternal grandfather, arrived in October 1896; and Michael was born in November 1897. Thomas, the family's last child, arrive three years later but was frail from birth and his absence from official records suggest that he died in infancy. The children were educated at the local school - conducted by religious order, the De La Salle Brothers - not far from the family home near Waterford's city center.

Arthur and Ellen, along with all of their children, returned to America in 1911, this time settling in Albany, New York, where Arthur's uncle, Ed Lynch, lived. The family's passage was paid by Ed, and it was in his home on Morton Avenue in Albany that the Flanagans settled initially and begin a new life. Louis and Mike completed their education at St. Anne's School in Albany.

Music was an every day part of life in the Flanagan household. Father Arthur played the single row accordion or melodeon, while mother Ellen was a singer with a large repertoire of Irish songs, which she taught to her children. Mike recalled that his first introduction to playing music was in Waterford when, at the age of ten, he plucked out a tune on a charred mandolin he had recovered from a fire. Later, in Albany, he joined family music sessions with his father and brother Joe, who was learning to play the accordion.

When school days ended, the brothers were attracted to the bright lights of New York City. Joseph found a job as a clerk in Manhattan in 1918. Mike joined him there and found work shoeing horses for a blacksmith and working as a furrier in the colorful midtown Irish neighborhood known as Hell's Kitchen. Louis, along with sisters Mary and Margaret followed and, along with their father, Arthur, set up house on E. 88th St.

Initial success 
In their free time, the brothers teamed up to play music for their own entertainment, and the Flanagan sound gradually evolved. Joe was becoming a fine accordion player while Lou added banjo accompaniment and later introduce the guitar - an instrument then new to accompanying Irish music. Mike switched from mandolin to banjo. He remembered buying his first tenor banjo from Eddie Peabody‘s music store on 34th St. The banjo was then uncharted territory in Irish music and Mike and Lou developed their own method of playing - Mike picking out tunes in unison with Joe’s accordion while Lou provided a chordal accompaniment with driving rhythm on his banjo or guitar. Between tunes, Joe lilted and sang all kinds of Irish and popular songs, with Mike providing harmony and choruses. Mike also learned to play the Jew's harp.

The continuous flow of immigrants into New York City had established the Irish as the city’s dominant ethnic group by the opening decades of the 20th century, with over half a million citizens having Irish connections. Countless bars, dancehalls, and social clubs prospered in Irish neighborhoods. These venues provided music, especially for dancing - the most popular form of entertainment among exiles. The Flanagan Brothers began playing these venues and It did not take long for a talented group like them to make an impression. The trio’s punchy, rhythmic brand of toe-tapping music was perfectly suited to noisy ball rooms. Their sound appealed to listeners and guaranteed a floor full of dancers. The brothers prospered, holding down day jobs and performing on weeknights and on weekends. During an interview, Mike recalled: “We’d play till two or three in the morning, come home, change our clothes, and go to work. That’s what I did many’s the night.“

Recording career 
The Flanagan Brothers were part of the large community of immigrant Irish musicians playing in New York City at that time. Inevitably, entrepreneurs recognized the potential market for this music as recording material for the increasingly popular 78 RPM discs. The major record companies were at first unconvinced and it fell to small, independent labels to prove the market existed. The Flanagans’ first disc, An Carrowath - featuring the horn pipe  – was released by the M&C New Republic Irish Record Company in December, 1921. An Carrowath was later recorded as a song, The Little Beggarman, and was also the name given to the group's recording of The Stack of Wheat. Thus begun a highly successful recording career which produced 168 records for numerous labels over the following decade.

New York buzzed with music sessions in bars, on radio, and in private homes. Mike recalled playing alongside fiddlers Michael Coleman, James Morrison, and other musicians whose fame would be established during this era.

For special occasions in the Irish calendar, the Flanagans joined forces with piper Tom Ennis to play as a quartet. Sadly, no recording of this combination is known to survive. Ennis was the owner of a music shop near Columbus Circle and Mike worked there at one time as a record salesman.

Following the release of their first disc, the brothers’ career continued to progress as they recorded for labels like Emerald, Gennett, and Vocalion, but they moved into the big league when they joined Columbia in 1923. Columbia's partnership with EMI in England meant that the Flanagans’ records could also be manufactured under license in England, and their discs were soon sold throughout Ireland.

The final elements in the commercial success of the Flanagans’ records were added in 1926 when they recorded Fun at Hogan’s, the first of many comics sketches adapted from standard Vaudevillian gags of the day. That same year their first song was recorded and Victor (later RCA Victor), Columbia's great rival, also recorded the group. Recurring ill health made Lou's role in the trio uncertain from this time, but Joe and Mike continued their act as a duo and added musicians for dancehall and studio work, as required.

The Flanagan's music was diverse and they recorded a wide variety of material. Their instrumental sound was unmistakable, even when they recorded under pseudonyms like The Irish Big Four, The Donovan Trio, or The County Cork Trio.

The Flanagan Brothers epitomized the flood of Irish musicians into America - their arrival in the big cities, the emergence of the recording and entertainment industries, the dance halls, and radio broadcasting - all of the things that are associated with the era.  They were at the center of all that.

Later years 
After their recording career peaked and the popularity of the dancehalls in New York City began to wane, the brothers became focused on their respective families and moved on from playing together.

Joe, who had married in 1923, remained in Queens and signed on as a regular player with an orchestra. Joe died in 1940.

Lou, who had continued to suffer from ill health, died at an early age in the mid 1930s.

Mike, who married his first wife in 1924, had moved back to Albany, New York by 1941 with his family. Mike began working for his brother-in-law, who had a successful wholesale produce business, but also remained an active musician. He would regularly play at the popular resorts and clubs in the “Irish Alps” – the area in and around the town of East Durham in New York's Catskill Mountains, where the center of Irish culture in the northeast had shifted. Mike had been joined by a new accordion player, Noel Rosenthal, and the duo, known as Mike & Ike, played the Catskill resorts and the local Albany scene well into the 1980s. Mike died in 1990.

Legacy 
In 1981, Celtic supergroup De Dannan recorded a cover of "My Irish Molly-O", a tune which the Flanagan Brothers popularized and first recorded in 1928. The De Dannan version of the song became a top-ten hit for the group, which led to a resurgence of interest in the Flanagan Brothers contributions.

Along with seven of his children, their respective spouses, and two of his grandchildren, Mike Flanagan returned to Ireland in 1983 for the last time. The renewed interest in his and his brothers’ music accorded Mike an interview on national television and an official civic reception in his hometown of Waterford during the visit. Perhaps a more important milestone during this trip, however, was the parting gift Mike was able to give on what he knew would be his last visit to Ireland. Accompanied by De Dannan founding member Frankie Gavin and noted accordionist Paul Brock, Mike gave an impromptu performance at Shannon International Airport while waiting for his plane back to New York.

In 2016, the Comhaltas Ceoltóirí Éireann (CCÉ), the primary Irish organization dedicated to the promotion of the music, song, dance and the language of Ireland, created The Mike Flanagan Award for Outstanding Achievement in Banjo due, in part, to the efforts of noted musician and scholar Mick Moloney. The award is presented annually at the CCÉ's music festival and competition, the Fleadh Cheoil, and is intended to honor Mike Flanagan as an ambassador of the golden era of Irish music in America. Many members of Mike's family traveled to Ireland in 2016 to participate in the initial award ceremony. During this visit, the City of Waterford once again honored Mike's legacy with a civic reception. The contributions of Mike and his brothers were further acknowledged with the placement of a distinguished Blue Plaque on their childhood home in Waterford at One Summerhill Terrace.

Discography

Partial discography - 78 rpm discs

Later compilations 

1979 The Flanagan Brothers - Topic
 Tunes We Play on Paddy's Day - Copperplate

Compilations with others
 2010 Irish Dance Music - Topic
 2010 Past Masters of Irish Dance Music - Topic
 2010 Round The House and Mind The Dresser - Topic

In 2009 My Irish Molly O from The Flanagan Brothers was included in Topic Records 70 year anniversary boxed set Three Score and Ten as track seven on the third CD.

References

Irish-American culture
Irish banjoists
Irish accordionists
Musicians from County Waterford